Timothy Walker HonFRPS (born 1970) is a British fashion photographer, who regularly works for Vogue, W and Love magazines. He is based in London.

Life and career

Walker was born in England in 1970. His interest in photography began at the Condé Nast library in London where he worked on the Cecil Beaton archive for a year before college. After obtaining an HBC in Photography at Exeter College of Art, Walker was awarded a third prize as The Independent Young Photographer Of The Year.

Upon leaving college in 1994, Walker worked as a freelance photographic assistant in London before moving to New York City as a full-time assistant to Richard Avedon. When he returned to England, he initially concentrated on portrait and documentary work for British newspapers. At the age of 25 he shot his first fashion story for Vogue, and has photographed for the British, Italian, and American editions. He has also shot notable covers for W Magazine, i-D, Vanity Fair, Another Man, and Better Homes and Gardens Magazine.

In 2019, Tim Walker shot the album artwork for Harry Styles' second album, Fine Line.

Exhibitions
Pictures, Design Museum, London, 2008 
Story Teller, Somerset House, London, 2012/2013 
Dreamscapes, Bowes Museum, Durham, UK, 2013. Curated by Greville Worthington. Work beyond the pages of Vogue and Vanity Fair.
Wonderful Things, Victoria and Albert Museum, London, 2019/2020, Galleries 38 and 38a Consisting of 10 rooms containing new projects, each one inspired by various artefacts from the V&A. Over the course of three years, Walker visited the V&A’s numerous storerooms, met with curators and technicians, even scaled the roof of the museum and climbed through the Victorian passages underneath it, in search of the items that would inspire each series. 
Wonderful People, Michael Hoppen Gallery, London, 2019/2020

Books 
 Tim Walker. Stern Portfolio. teNeues, 2006. 
 Pictures. teNeues, 2008. 
 The Lost Explorer. teNeues, 2011. 
 Story Teller. Thames & Hudson, 2012. .
The Granny Alphabet. Thames & Hudson, 2013. .
The Garden of Earthly Delights. 
Shoot for the Moon. Thames & Hudson, 2019. .
Wonderful Things, V&A 2019, .

Films

Short films directed by Walker
The Lost Explorer (BBC Films, 2010)
The Mechanical Man of the Moon (2014)
The Muse (2014)
The Magic Paintbrush (2016)

Music videos co-directed by Walker
"Blissing Me" (2017) by Björk – co-directed with Emma Dalzell

Awards
Isabella Blow award for Fashion Creator from The British Fashion Council, 2008 
Infinity Award from the International Center of Photography, New York City, 2009 
Best short film, Chicago United Film Festival, 2011, for The Lost Explorer
Honorary Fellowship from The Royal Photographic Society, 2012

Collections
Walker's photography is held in the archives of the following collections:
Victoria and Albert Museum, London

Other work can be located in two permanent collection galleries, featuring two of his films -

The Steadfast Tin Soldier • The Modern Media Gallery, Room 99

The Rebel Belle • Theatre & Performance, Room 104

National Portrait Gallery, London

References

External links 

1970 births
Living people
Artists from London
Fashion photographers
English photographers
Fellows of the Royal Photographic Society